Patrick L. Brockett is an endowed Chaired Professor (Gus Wortham Chair in Risk Management and Insurance) within the Information, Risk and Operations Management, Finance, and Mathematics departments at The University of Texas at Austin. He is the Director of the Risk Management and Insurance Program, Director for the Center of Risk Management and Insurance, and Director for the Minor/Certificate in Risk Management Program. He is also an Affiliated Faculty Member in the University of Texas- Austin Division of Statistics & Scientific Computation.  He is known for his research in statistics, probability, actuarial science, quantitative methods in business and social sciences, and risk and insurance. The American Risk and Insurance Association (ARIA) endowed and named a research award in his honor: The Patrick Brockett & Arnold Shapiro Actuarial Research Award, awarded to the actuarial journal article that makes the best contribution of interest to ARIA risk management and insurance researchers.

Career 
Patrick Lee Brockett received his B.A. in mathematics from the California State University at Long Beach, California. He then received his master's degree and Ph.D. in mathematics in 1975 from the University of California at Irvine, California. After graduation he taught in the mathematics department at Tulane University (1975-1977) and the mathematics department at the University of Texas at Austin (1977- 1980).  In 1980 he switched to the actuarial science program in the Finance Department at the University of Texas at Austin, ultimately becoming the director of this program in the Finance Department.  In 1995 he became Director of the Risk Management and Insurance program and switched his primary affiliation (and the Risk Management program) to the Department of Management Science and Information Systems (now known as the Department of Information, Risk, and Operations Management) still at the University of Texas at Austin. During his time at the University of Texas at Austin he served as Senior Associate Director, and then Director of the Center for Cybernetic Studies (1990-1996), Senior Associate Director, and then Director of the Center for Management of Operations and Logistics (1996-1999), and Director of the Center for Risk Management and Insurance (1999-2022).  In addition to Patrick Brockett's roles at The University of Texas at Austin, Dr. Brockett also served the state of Texas as a member of the Board of Directors of the Texas Property and Casual Guaranty Association from 1999 – March 2020, the organization that handles claims for insolvent Texas domesticated Property and Casualty insurance companies. He is currently the Editor for the North American Actuarial Journal, and an Associate Editor for the Journal of Insurance Issues and on the Editorial Board Member of the Journal of Risk and Financial Management , and is on the board of directors of Incline National Insurance Company. Brockett was elected to and served as President of the American Risk and Insurance Association (2001-2002).

Brockett has earned many awards and honors, some of which are detailed below.

Elected Professional Society Elected Fellowships and Honors 
National Academy of Social Insurance (Elected Member 2023)

The Institute of Strategic Risk Management (Elected Fellow 2022)

The Institute of Risk Management (Elected Fellow 2008)

International Statistical Institute (Elected Member 2006)

American Risk and Insurance Association Outstanding Achievement Award, 2006

The American Association for the Advancement of Science (Elected Fellow 1993)

The Royal Statistical Society Fellow (Elected Chartered Statistician #781 by RSS 10 March 1993)

The American Statistical Association (Elected Fellow 1992)

The Institute of Mathematical Statistics (Elected Fellow 1989)

The Operations Research Society of America (now INFORMS), elected as "Full Member" of ORSA, before it merged with the Institute of Management Sciences to form INFORMS

Research Article Awards and Honors 
 Best 2018 North American Actuarial Journal Article Award (Article: "Potential “Savings” of Medicare: The Analysis of Medicare Advantage and Accountable Care Organizations”) awarded 2019.
 2017 Spencer L. Kimball Prize by the National Association of Insurance Commissioners for best article in the Journal of Insurance Regulation (Article: “How to Set Rates if You Must: An Efficiency-Based Methodology for Setting Promulgated Insurance Rates with an Application to Title Insurance")
 2016 Best North American Actuarial Journal Article Award (Article: "Empirical Evidence on the Use of Credit Scoring for Predicting Insurance Losses with Psycho-Social and Biochemical Explanations")
 American Risk and Insurance Association's Excellence in Teaching Award, 2011.  This award recognizes excellence in risk management and insurance teaching. Applicants have a distinguished record of excellent teaching throughout their academic career. This award is only given in years when an exceptional candidate is identified. 
 8th Most Cited Journal of Risk and Insurance article, 2009 (Article: "Using Kohonen's self-organizing feature map to uncover automobile bodily injury claims fraud")
 Top Ten Most Published Researcher in the World in the 75-year history of the Journal of Risk and Insurance, 2008 (Article: “The Journal of Risk and Insurance: A 75-Year Historical Perspective”)
 Casualty Actuarial Society’s ARIA Research Prize, 2008 (Article: “Biological and Psychobehavioral Correlates of Risk Taking, Credit Scores, and Automobile Insurance Losses:  Toward an Explication of Why Credit Scoring Works”). This award is given by the Casualty Actuarial Society to “the author(s) of that paper published by the American Risk and Insurance Association (ARIA) which provides the most valuable contribution to casualty actuarial science.”
 Risk Management and Insurance Review  Perspectives Award, 2006 (Article: “Weather Derivatives and Weather Risk Management”)
 Robert C. Witt Research Award, 2005 (Article: “A Comparison of HMO Efficiencies as a Function of Provider Autonomy”). This Award is given by the American Risk and Insurance Association to the best feature article published in the Journal of Risk and Insurance "based on the importance of the subject and the value of the contribution to the literature."
 Robert I. Mehr Award, 2004 (Article: "A Neural Network Method for Obtaining an Early Warning of Insurer Insolvency"). The Mehr Award given by the American Risk and Insurance Association “for that journal article making a ten year lasting contribution to risk management” and having “withstood the test of time”. 
 Casualty’s Actuarial Society’s ARIA Research Prize, 2003 (Article: “Fraud Classification Using Principal Component Analysis of RIDITs”). This award is given by the Casualty Actuarial Society to “the author(s) of that paper published by the American Risk and Insurance Association (ARIA) which provides the most valuable contribution to casualty actuarial science.”
 Casualty’s Actuarial Society’s ARIA Research Prize, 2001 (Article: “Great (and not so Great) Expectations: An Endogenous Economic Explication of Insurance Cycles and Liability Crises”). This award is given by the Casualty Actuarial Society to “the author(s) of that paper published by the American Risk and Insurance Association (ARIA) which provides the most valuable contribution to casualty actuarial science.”
 International Brian Hey Prize (Second Place), 2000 (Article: “Great (and not so Great) Expectations: An Endogenous Economic Explication of Insurance Cycles and Liability Crises”).  This prize is given by the Institute and Faculty of Actuaries (IFoA) in the UK.
 David Rist Prize (Finalist), 1999 (Article: “Forecasting and Allocation of US Army Recruiting Resources”). The Rist Prize recognizes the practical benefit sound operations research can have on real life decision-making, and recipients have influenced major decisions or practices through excellent, applied analyses and research.
 Society of Actuaries Annual Best Paper Prize, 1996 (Article: “Actuarial Uses of Grouped Data: An Information Theoretic Approach to Incorporating Secondary Data”)
 Franz Edelman Competition (Semi-finalist), 1995 (Article: “Forecasting and Allocation of US Army Recruiting Resources”). The Edelman competition attests to the contributions of operations research and analytics in both the profit and non-profit sectors.The purpose of the competition is to bring forward, recognize and reward outstanding examples of operations research, management science, and advanced analytics in practice in the world,
 International Insurance Society Best Paper Award, 1994 (Article: "Ambiguity, Risk Charges, and Insurance Pricing")
 The Halmsted Prize for the Most Outstanding English Language Publication in Actuarial Science in the World, 1993 (Article: "Information Theoretic Approach to Actuarial Science:  A Unification and Extension of Relevant Theory and Applications").  This prize is give by the Society of Actuaries. A committee of the Society's Education and Research Section examines all major English language actuarial journals and awards the prize to their selected best paper.
 American Statistical Association Award for “Most Outstanding Statistical Application Article Published in any Journal, in any Field, and in any Language During 1990 or 1991, 1992 (Article: "Information Theoretic Approach to Actuarial Science:  A Unification and Extension of Relevant Theory and Applications")
 American Risk and Insurance Association’s Award for “Outstanding Feature Article”, 1986 (Article: "Information Theoretic Approach to Actuarial Science:  A Unification and Extension of Relevant Theory and Applications")
 American Risk and Insurance Association's Award for “Outstanding Communication Article”,  (Article: "Insurance Versus Self-Insurance: A Risk Management Perspective"). This Award is given by the American Risk and Insurance Association to the best communication article published in the Journal of Risk and Insurance

University of Texas at Austin Awards and Honors 
 Fellow, UT Austin Humanities Research Institute
 Outstanding Graduate Teacher Award: UT Austin Graduate School, 1995
 Award for Research Excellence, presented by The University of Texas College of Business Foundation Advisory Council (1984 and 1992)

Books 

 Brockett, Patrick L., and A. Levine. 1984.  Statistics, Probability and Their Applications, W. B. Saunders Publishing Co., (Reprinted in Japan, by HRW International, 1986).
 Baranoff, Etti G, Patrick Brockett and Yehuda Kahane, Risk Management for the Enterprise and Individuals, Flatworld Knowledge Publisher, Spring 2009. http://www.flatworldknowledge.com/
 Baranoff, Etti, Patrick Brockett, Yehuda Kahane, and Dalit Baranoff  (2019) Risk Management for Individuals and Enterprises 2nd Edition, (2019)  Flatworld Publishers
 Baranoff, Etti, Patrick Brockett, Yehuda Kahane, and Dalit Baranoff  (2021) Risk Management for Individuals and Enterprises v2.1, (2021) Discipline: Finance  Flatworld Publishers (Updated to include Corona impact and risk control)

Monographs 

 Aird, Paul, Patrick Brockett, and Robert C. Witt. 1993. An Analysis of Pricing and Availability Problems in the Texas Automobile Insurance Market, National Association of Independent Insurers.
 Brockett, Patrick L. and Patricia Arnold 2004 “Deregulation, Pricing and Availability Issues in the Texas Homeowners Insurance Market” (Fall) 2004 monograph, Texas Public Policy Foundation
 National Research Council of the National Academy of Sciences. Levees and the National Flood Insurance Program: Improving Policies and Practices. Washington, DC: The National Academies Press, 2013 (Brockett was part of National Research Council committee that wrote the monograph)
 National Research Council of the National Academy of Sciences. Affordability of National Flood Insurance Program Premiums -- Report 1, Washington, DC: The National Academies Press, 2014 (Brockett was part of National Research Council committee that wrote the monograph)
 National Research Council of the National Academy of Sciences. Affordability of National Flood Insurance Program Premiums -- Report 2, Washington, DC: The National Academies Press, 2015 (Brockett was part of National Research Council committee that wrote the monograph)

References

Year of birth missing (living people)
Living people
Economists from California
University of Texas at Austin faculty
California State University, Long Beach alumni
University of California, Irvine alumni
Fellows of the American Statistical Association